David Virelles (born 1983) is a Cuban jazz pianist and composer.

Early life
Virelles was born in Cuba in 1983 and grew up in Santiago. His father is José Aquiles, a singer-songwriter; his mother was a Santiago de Cuba Symphony flautist. Virelles started classical piano studies at the age of seven and heard various forms of Cuban music during his childhood. He met Canadian musician Jane Bunnett in Cuba and she invited him to Toronto. He eventually studied at the University of Toronto and Humber College. Virelles also recorded and toured with Bunnett, including for her 2001 album Alma de Santiago. He started communicating via e-mail and telephone with Steve Coleman around 2006; the saxophonist gave him detailed responses to questions on music.

Later life and career
A Canada Council for the Arts grant allowed Virelles to study with Henry Threadgill in New York. Virelles moved to New York permanently in 2009 and soon played with major jazz figures, including saxophonists Coleman, Chris Potter and Mark Turner.

Virelles was part of a trio in 2010, with bassist Ben Street and drummer Andrew Cyrille, that played largely improvised music. The pianist later added percussionist Román Díaz to this group.
In 2011, Virelles played prepared piano, celeste and harmonium on Potter's album The Sirens. Virelles made his ECM Records leader debut with the 2014 release Mbókò. The Guardian reviewer reported that "Virelles explores ancient Afro-Cuban sacred and ritual musics through imaginative fusions with contemporary materials. Mostly he does this by using the two basses as drones, mixing spacious chord-moods with bursts of startling improvisation in a flux of styles, and focusing much of the melody-playing on [the two] drummers."

Discography

As leader/co-leader

As sideman

References

1983 births
Virelles, David
Cuban jazz pianists
Place of birth missing (living people)
21st-century pianists
Justin Time Records artists